Børge Hougaard Petersen (11 June 1921 – 4 May 2012) was a Danish rower who competed at the 1948 Summer Olympics in London. He participated in the Men's eight alongside Charles Willumsen, Ib Nielsen, Niels Rasmussen, Gerhardt Sørensen, Jarl Emcken, Poul Korup, Holger Larsen, and Niels Wamberg, but the team was eliminated in the opening round. He was born in Nykøbing Falster and competed for Roklubben Skjold, with whom he won the eights event at the Danish national rowing championships for three consecutive years from 1947 through 1949, and again in 1953.

References

1921 births
2012 deaths
Danish male rowers
Rowers at the 1948 Summer Olympics
Olympic rowers of Denmark
People from Guldborgsund Municipality
European Rowing Championships medalists
Sportspeople from Region Zealand